Sea snail is a common name for slow-moving marine gastropod molluscs, usually with visible external shells, such as whelk or abalone. They share the taxonomic class Gastropoda with slugs, which are distinguished from snails primarily by the absence of a visible shell.

Definition
Determining whether some gastropods should be called sea snails is not always easy. Some species that live in brackish water (such as certain neritids) can be listed as either freshwater snails or marine snails, and some species that live at or just above the high tide level (for example, species in the genus Truncatella) are sometimes considered to be sea snails and sometimes listed as land snails.

Anatomy
Sea snails are a very large and diverse group of animals. Most snails that live in salt water respire using a gill or gills; a few species, though, have a lung, are intertidal, and are active only at low tide when they can move around in the air. These air-breathing species include false limpets in the family Siphonariidae and another group of false limpets in the family Trimusculidae.

Many, but not all, sea snails have an operculum.

Shell
The shells of most species of sea snails are spirally coiled. Some, though, have conical shells, and these are often referred to by the common name of limpets. In one unusual family (Juliidae), the shell of the snail has become two hinged plates closely resembling those of a bivalve; this family is sometimes called the "bivalved gastropods".

Their shells are found in a variety of shapes and sizes, but are normally very small. Because the shells of sea snails are strong and durable in many cases, as a group they are well represented in the fossil record.

The shells of snails are complex and grow at different speeds. The speed of growth is affected by a few variables such as the temperature of the water, depth of the water, food present for the snail, as well as isotopic oxygen levels. By looking at the composition of aragonite in the growth layers of mollusks you can predict the size the mollusk shell can reach.

Taxonomy

2005 taxonomy
The following cladogram is an overview of the main clades of living gastropods based on the taxonomy of Bouchet & Rocroi (2005), with taxa that contain saltwater or brackish water species marked in boldface (some of the highlighted taxa consist entirely of marine species, but some of them also contain freshwater or land species.)

 Clade Patellogastropoda
 Clade Vetigastropoda
 Clade Cocculiniformia
 Clade Neritimorpha
 Clade Cycloneritimorpha
 Clade Caenogastropoda
 Informal group Architaenioglossa
 Clade Sorbeoconcha
 Clade Hypsogastropoda
 Clade Littorinimorpha
 Informal group Ptenoglossa
 Clade Neogastropoda
 Clade Heterobranchia
 Informal group Lower Heterobranchia
 Informal group Opisthobranchia
 Clade Cephalaspidea
 Clade Thecosomata
 Clade Gymnosomata
 Clade Aplysiomorpha
 Group Acochlidiacea
 Clade Sacoglossa
 Group Cylindrobullida
 Clade Umbraculida
 Clade Nudipleura
 Clade Pleurobranchomorpha
 Clade Nudibranchia
 Clade Euctenidiacea
 Clade Dexiarchia
 Clade Pseudoeuctenidiacea
 Clade Cladobranchia
 Clade Euarminida
 Clade Dendronotida
 Clade Aeolidida
 Informal group Pulmonata
 Informal group Basommatophora
 Clade Eupulmonata
 Clade Systellommatophora
 Clade Stylommatophora
 Clade Elasmognatha
 Clade Orthurethra
 Informal group Sigmurethra

Uses

By humans
A number of species of sea snails are harvested in aquaculture and used by humans for food, including abalone, conch, limpets, whelks (such as the North American Busycon species and the North Atlantic Buccinum undatum) and periwinkles including Littorina littorea.

The shells of sea snails are often found washed up on beaches. Because many are attractive and durable, they have been used to make necklaces and other jewelry since prehistoric times.

The shells of a few species of large sea snails within the Vetigastropoda have a thick layer of nacre and have been used as a source of mother of pearl. Historically, the button industry relied on these species for a number of years.

By non-human animals
The shells of sea snails are used for protection by many kinds of hermit crabs. A hermit crab carries the shell by grasping the central columella of the shell using claspers on the tip of its abdomen.

See also
 Freshwater snail
 Terrestrial molluscs
 Land snail
 Sea slug
 Slug

References

Mollusc common names
Articles containing video clips